Howl-O-Scream is an annual Halloween seasonal event that occurs during the month of October at Busch Gardens Tampa Bay, Busch Gardens Williamsburg, SeaWorld San Antonio, and as of recently began at SeaWorld Orlando and SeaWorld San Diego. The parks remain operational during the day and transition to Howl-O-Scream at night. The event features haunted houses, "scare zones", and live entertainment.

The event at Busch Gardens Tampa Bay in Tampa, Florida primarily competes with Universal Studios' Halloween Horror Nights, both of which are known for their grotesque and macabre-themed haunted houses and scare zones. Howl-O-Scream contains intense adult content such as violence, gore and blood and sexual innuendo.  As such, it is not intended for children.

While this event is intended for adults only, individuals under the age of 18 are admitted to the event, however, the event is not recommended for children under the age of 13.

History
The event takes place during select nights in October, typically on the weekends. The event focuses on haunted houses, "scare zones," and shows that pertain to a particular theme. The haunted houses are enclosed areas with specific storylines and highly themed decor. Typically, they lead guests through a somewhat claustrophobic maze with various features designed to startle, confuse or disquiet those who enter by using a combination of strobe lights, fog machines and other accessories of this sort. Scare zones are similar to haunted houses, except they are set in outdoor areas along the main paths. Scare zones also feature a specific theme and contain objects typically used in haunted houses: people dressed up as creatures pertaining to the theme, fog machines, strobe lights, and other decor such as damaged boxes, broken street lights, and similar accoutrements that also pertain to the theme. The shows are similar in structure to the standard stage shows shown at Busch Gardens, however they have a Halloween setting and feature dark humor, grotesque scenery and sexual innuendo.

Howl-O-Scream was not the first Halloween event at Busch Gardens Tampa Bay. One year prior to Howl-O-Scream's debut in the year 2000, the park featured a PG-13 Halloween attraction called Spooky Safari. It had such attractions as an outdoor sprawling haunted experience called "Haunted Jungle Trail", a pyrotechnic/magic show, a pumpkin patch, hayrides, and face-painting for the children.

Event summaries

Busch Gardens Tampa Bay

Busch Gardens Williamsburg

SeaWorld San Antonio

Haunted house locations

Busch Gardens Tampa Bay
The following list contains the facilities used by Busch Gardens Tampa Bay to host the haunted houses for Howl-O-Scream. They might be warehouses, existing queue lines, or temporary buildings.

Year-by-year evolution

Busch Gardens Tampa Bay
The year 2000 saw the debut of Howl-O-Scream. The event replaced a smaller event called "Spooky Safari," expanding on an event oriented primarily toward younger children into one that offered Halloween-themed attractions, shows, and events for teens and adults as well.
The debut event opened with four haunted experiences: two haunted houses, one haunted trail, and one haunt which would be characterized as a hay ride had it not been in a theme park.  Shows included a celebrity appearance by Butch Patrick of The Munsters and the mentalist, The Amazing Kreskin.  There was one park-wide scare zone.  The 1961 Cadillac hearse from TV's Dr. Paul Bearer's Creature Feature shows was also on display.  In an effort to maintain its children's demographic, a "Monster Free Zone" was included, featuring face painting, arts and crafts and hay rides.

In 2001, Howl-O-Scream added new haunted mazes, scare zones, and shows, and re-positioned the event toward an older teen and young adult demographic.  The park's "Land of the Dragons" children's area continued to offer fare for younger children.

There were five haunted houses, with no carryovers from 2000.  There were three scare zones, with one being the haunted trail from 2000.  Two shows were produced by the park, replacing the celebrity shows of the year previous. This year scare zones were not listed on the park map, although there were three.

In 2002, Howl-O-Scream featured six haunted houses, with only one holdover from the previous year. The same overall concept and demographic target was also retained. There were four scare zones: two holdovers and two new.  The haunted trail was retired. The two shows were both holdovers from 2001.

The park further refined their formula for 2003, with a focus on furthering their backstory lines. There were four haunted houses and one haunted trail, for a total of five experiences: four from the previous year, one new house and with one from 2002 retiring.  The scare zones were five, three from 2002 and two new.  There were three shows: one holdover, and one new show, both produced by the park.  The third was brought in by a vendor.

Howl-O-Scream returned in 2004. However, multiple storms from the 2004 Atlantic hurricane season delayed the start of the event.  Hurricane Jeanne was the most damaging, causing a possible F1 tornado touchdown on the original building for the Corporate Nightmare haunted house, destroying it. The hurricane itself also caused moderate damage to the props in the Garden of the Cursed and Agony Express scare zones. Corporate Nightmare was moved to Tut's Tomb on the second night of the event, and the props in the two scare zones were rebuilt.   There were five haunted houses, three being new, plus one haunted trail.  There were four scare zones: three being new.  There were two shows, one of which was new.

2005 featured six haunted houses, five scare zones and two shows. Only one haunted house had appeared the year before.  All of the scare zone themes were new, and one of the two shows was new.  The "Hunted" haunted house in Nairobi Pavilion is said to be the first time the "victim" scare was used. It involves a cast member dressed in plain clothes and seemingly snatched violently from the crowd.

A small fire started in the front of "The Hunted" haunted house one evening about halfway through the run. The house was evacuated and closed while it checked and aired out; no injuries were reported and the house reopened within a matter of hours. The fire was traced to a guest's cigarette, put out carelessly on a burned prop couch in the opening hallway of the house. Security in the lines was increased to avoid further incidents.

Howl-O-Scream 2006 featured six haunted houses, one of which was new.  There were five scare zones, two of which were new.  Three shows rounded out the offerings, of which two were new.

2007 saw six haunted houses again, with three of them being new.  Five scare zones (two new) and three shows, two being new.  There was also the addition of five mini-scare zones, which were much smaller free-roaming zones which were not listed on park maps or the official website.  They primarily involved performers intermingling with guests. They would later inspire the "Roaming Hordes" park-wide scare zones in 2008, 2009, and 2011.  The event icon for 2007, "The Death Jockey", had his exploits chronicled in comic book form on the HOS website.

2008 consisted of six haunted houses, three being new; four scare zones, one of which was new; and three shows, with two being new.  The new scare zone was actually the "Roaming Hordes" descendant of the mini-zones the previous year.

This year also represented Busch's first use of their HOS website to build interest for the event all year by using a "teaser" strategy, along with occasional updates.

The year 2009 was Howl-O-Scream's tenth anniversary, featuring seven haunts, of which four were holdovers and three were new.  Five scare zones were mounted, four of which had new themes. There were five shows, four of which were new.  One of the new shows featured the Magic of Jason Byrne, an award-winning stage magician.  Also new was Club Envy, an adults only nightclub, which was an added-cost option.

In 2010 there were eight haunted houses, two of which were new; six scare zones, all of which were new, and three shows, two of which were new.  The Alone haunted house is an added cost attraction, with the option for the guest to experience it alone or with up to three other people.

2011 featured seven haunted houses, three being new. The Alone premium house continued this year. There are no scare zones, per se, as the actors roam park wide.  There are two shows, one being new.

2012 included seven haunts, two new;  two new scare zones and  one show.  The Faded Memories zone was a retrospective of the last 13 years of Howl-O-Scream.

2013  included eight haunted houses, of which three were new.  There were three scare zones, all of them new. There was one show.

In 2014, there were eight haunted houses, no scare zones, and one show.  Three of the haunted houses were new.

2015 consisted of seven haunted houses, one scare zone, and one show. Two of the haunts were new.

Busch Gardens Williamsburg
In 2014, there were five haunted houses, a park-wide scare zone, and two shows.

2015 consisted of seven haunted houses, five scare zones, and three shows. Three of the haunts were new.

See also
Halloween Spooktacular
Six Flags Fright Fest

References

External links
Official Tampa Howl-O-Scream site
Official Williamsburg Howl-O-Scream site
Official SeaWorld San Antonio Howl-O-Scream site

Halloween events in the United States
Haunted attractions (simulated)
Busch Gardens Tampa Bay
1999 establishments in Florida
Recurring events established in 1999